Resurrection is a Soviet film made in 1960-1961, directed by Mikhail Schweitzer and based on his and Yevgeny Gabrilovich's adaptation of the Russian writer Leo Tolstoy's 1899 novel of the same name.

Plot
In the District Court, a jury hears about the fatal poisoning of a merchant Smyelkov. Among the three accused of the crime is the burgher Ekaterina Maslova, a prostitute. Maslova is innocent, but, as a result of a miscarriage of justice, she is sentenced to four years' hard labor in Siberia.

At the trial, one of the jurors is Prince Dmitri Nekhlyudov, who recognizes the defendant. About ten years ago, he seduced and abandoned her. Feeling guilty about this, Nekhlyudov decides to hire a well-known lawyer for her, to appeal her conviction, and to help her with money.

Struck by the injustice in the court, Nekhlyudov begins to feel disgust for, and an aversion to, all the people with whom he interacts with in his daily life, in particular to the representatives of high society. He decides to abandon his current society and to go abroad. Nekhlyudov recalls Maslova - what he saw her at the trial, and then other moments he shared with her.

Cast
Tamara Syomina as Katyusha Maslova
Yevgeny Matveyev as Prince Nekhludov
Pavel Massalsky as Presiding Judge
Viktor Kulakov as Member of the Court  
Vasili Bokarev as Member of the Court
Lev Zolotukhin as Prosecutor  
Vladimir Sez as Court Secretary
Vyacheslav Sushkevich as Prison Warden  
Nikolai Svobodin as Retired Colonel  
Aleksandr Khvylya as Merchant  
Alexander Smirnov as Nikiforov  
Sergei Kalinin as Member of Workers Collective  
Nina Samsonova as Bochkova
Vladimir Boriskin as Kartinkin 
  Valentina Vladimirova as prisoner
Nikolai Sergeyev as prison warden  
Anastasa Zuyeva as Matryona Kharina  
Vladimir Gusev as Simonson
Klara Rumyanova as Bogodukhovskaya  
 Maya Bulgakova as Anisya
 Vladislav Strzhelchik as Earl Shembok
Vasily Livanov as Kryltsov  
 Vladimir Belokurov as Maslennikov
Nikolai Pazhitnov as Maslova's Lawyer  
Valentina Telegina as Korablyova
Olesya Ivanova as Red-Headed Woman
Mariya Vinogradova as Khoroshavka  
Mikhail Sidorkin as Lawyer Fonarin 
Grigori Konsky as Korchagin 
Elena Yelina as Sofya Ivanovna
Sofya Garrel Garell as Marya Ivanovna
 Rolan Bykov as madman
Aleksandra Panova as Agrafena Petrovna  
Aleksey Konsovsky as Narrator's voice

Reception 
Tamara Syomina's acting was praised by Federico Fellini and Giulietta Masina.

Awards
 1962 – International Film Festival in Locarno premium FIPRESCI best actress (Tamara Syomina)

References

External links

 Resurrection at kino-teatr.ru
Leo Tolstoi State Memorial Museum

Soviet drama films
1960 drama films
1960 films
Films based on Resurrection
Films directed by Mikhail Shveytser
Films scored by Georgy Sviridov